The Belleville News-Democrat is a daily newspaper in Belleville, Illinois. Focusing on news that is local to the area of southwestern Illinois, it has been published under various names for 150 years.  As of 2009, it is published by The McClatchy Company, and is based in St. Clair County, Illinois. It publishes content in print as well as online at bnd.com.

History 
The Belleville News-Democrat was founded in 1858 as the Weekly Democrat. In the early 1860s, it merged with the Belleville News to become the Belleville News-Democrat. It was a family-owned newspaper until 1972, when it was purchased by Capital Cities Communications. When Disney acquired Capital Cities, it briefly owned the News-Democrat until Knight Ridder acquired the newspaper in 1997. McClatchy acquired the paper in 2006 with its purchase of Knight Ridder.

Distinction 

The Belleville News-Democrat has been featured on the television programs 60 Minutes, Dateline and Nightline, as an example of investigative reporting. In 2003, an article in Editor & Publisher called the News-Democrat one of "Ten newspapers that do it right" under the leadership of former publisher, Gary Berkeley, and former editor, Greg Edwards. It is also the only newspaper in Illinois or Missouri to grow net paid circulation for ten years in a row, and is a frequent winner in state and regional journalism awards.

In 2007, News-Democrat reporters Beth Hundsdorfer and George Pawlaczyk won the Robert F. Kennedy Journalism Award for "Lethal Lapses", a series investigating errors of the Illinois Department of Children and Family Services that resulted in the deaths of 53 children.

Staff 

The newspaper employs approximately 280 people, plus about 75 at its weekly ancillary papers. The newsroom staff consists of 26 reporters, 12 editors, seven copy editors, four photographers, three newsroom assistants and an editorial cartoonist, (see:  Glenn McCoy).

Other publications
It publishes separate editions in Madison County and St. Clair County.

The News-Democrat also publishes the following weekly papers: 
 The Highland News Leader
 Tri-County Leader
 O'Fallon Progress
 Command Post (serving Scott Air Force Base)
  Legal Reporter
 Penny Saver

Counties served

Illinois 
 St. Clair
 Madison
 Bond
 Clinton
 Washington
 Monroe
 Marion
 Randolph
 Perry
 Jefferson

Missouri 
 St. Louis
 St. Louis City

References

External links

 bnd.com official site
 Official mobile website
 The McClatchy Company's subsidiary profile of the Belleville News-Democrat
 the Lethal Lapses series

Newspapers published in Illinois
McClatchy publications
St. Clair County, Illinois
Belleville, Illinois
Former subsidiaries of The Walt Disney Company